Paul Michael Edwards (born 16 February 1959 in Chiswick, Greater London) is a retired professional athlete who competed in the men's shot put event during his career. He competed for both Wales and England during his career and twice represented Great Britain at the Summer Olympics: 1988 and 1992. Edwards was affiliated with the Walton Athletic Club and Belgrave Harriers in London. He represented Great Britain 43 times and won 11 AAA titles and 5 UK titles. He also represented Great Britain in decathlon and held Welsh national records at shot put, discus and decathlon and won 9 Welsh titles.

Doping

In 1994 Edwards failed two drugs tests. The first sample was from the 1994 European Athletics Championships in Helsinki and was positive for a cocktail of banned substances, including anabolic steroids, raised testosterone and the stimulant pseudoephedrine. The second sample was from two days later, home in Britain. Edwards was given a four-year ban from sports for these anti-doping rule violations. In 1997, while he was still banned, he was tested out of competition and was found to be positive for testosterone. He subsequently received a lifetime doping ban.

Edwards has previously raised Freedom Of Information Act requests to King's College London to help clear his name; it has also been the subject of parliamentary questions. A legal ruling from the British High Courts of Justice dated 29 November 2013 further substantiates the irregularities which form the basis of Edwards' ongoing efforts to clear his name.

References

1959 births
Living people
People from Chiswick
Welsh male shot putters
British male shot putters
British decathletes
Olympic athletes of Great Britain
Athletes (track and field) at the 1988 Summer Olympics
Athletes (track and field) at the 1992 Summer Olympics
Commonwealth Games bronze medallists for Wales
Commonwealth Games medallists in athletics
Athletes (track and field) at the 1990 Commonwealth Games
Doping cases in athletics
British sportspeople in doping cases
Medallists at the 1990 Commonwealth Games